Wainui Bay is within Golden Bay, and at the south-eastern end of Golden Bay, in the Tasman Region of the South Island, New Zealand. There are several Department of Conservation walking tracks that start in Wainui Bay, including the Wainui Falls track, the Taupo Point track, and other tracks leading into the Abel Tasman National Park.

References

Beaches of the Tasman District
Bays of the Tasman District
Golden Bay